Denison Bollay (born 1952) is a software engineer working on programming languages and search algorithms, with applications for e-commerce and financial information.

History
Bollay is the author of ExperLogo and ExperLisp, the first incrementally compiled object-oriented programming languages for a personal computer, the Apple Macintosh. He introduced the world to the first Interface Builder in 1986, and the first dynamic interface building tool Action! in 1988. He was also the creator of DynamicDocuments in 1988, the first object-oriented, multimedia hypertext system (built in the language Lisp), WebBase, the first dynamic web server in 1995, and WebData (a database of databases web portal).

In 1999, he founded ExperClick, the first real-time internet auction market. The company's name was changed to AdECN in 2006. It was sold to Microsoft in August 2007.

Bollay was awarded . He has many pending patents. He founded ExperTelligence in 1984, 3DStockCharts.com in 1999, ExperClick in 2000, and became Chairman of MicroMLS in 2004.

He is also one of the authors (with Mel Beckman and Brian Fox) of the BuddyCast peer-to-peer streaming media protocol.

Computer Camp
In 1980, Denison Bollay created The Original Computer Camp, an outdoor tech camping experience for kids. It included horseback riding, campfires, and a hundred computers, including Apple IIs, Ataris, TRS-80s, and Texas Instruments TI-99/4As. There were robots, turtles (silicon based), and synthesized computer music. It was featured on the front page of The Wall Street Journal, launching a trend that encouraged thousands of children to become interested in software.

He graduated from Harvey Mudd College in 1974.

References

Harvey Mudd College alumni
Living people
1952 births